Lydia Sherwood (5 May 1906 – 20 April 1989) was a British film actress and stage actress. She made her debut on stage in Daisy Fisher's comedy play Lavender Ladies. She was married to the poet Lazarus Aaronson from 1924 to 1931.

Filmography

Film

Stage Appearances

 Lavender Ladies (1925) (Comedy Theatre, London)
 The Last Hour (1928) (Comedy Theatre, London)
 She Stoops to Conquer (1930) (Lyric Theatre (Hammersmith), London)
 Uncle Vanya (1937) (Westminster Theatre, London)
 Hamlet (1951) (New Theatre (London))

References

Bibliography

Wearing, J.P. (2014). The London Stage 1920-1929: A Calendar of Productions, Performers and Personnel. Rowan and Littfield Education

External links
 

1906 births
1989 deaths
English film actresses
Actresses from London
20th-century English actresses
English stage actresses
Alumni of RADA